Stigmodera is a genus of beetles in the family Buprestidae, the jewel beetles. It is a large genus that some authors divide into three separate genera. Others keep them together, making Stigmodera a genus of some 550 species. Most are native to Australia and a few occur in New Guinea.

Species include:

 Stigmodera cancellata (Donovan, 1805)
 Stigmodera gratiosa Chevrolat, 1843
 Stigmodera hyperboreus (Heer, 1870)
 Stigmodera jacquinotii (Boisduval, 1835)
 Stigmodera macularia (Donovan, 1805)
 Stigmodera porosa Carter, 1916
 Stigmodera roei Saunders, 1868
 Stigmodera sanguinosa Hope, 1846

References

External links
Gigli, M. Australia: Land of Stigmodera

Buprestidae genera